Dara Ó Briain's Science Club is a British science television series presented by Dara Ó Briain which first aired on BBC Two between 6 November 2012 and 29 August 2013. Each week, the team take one subject and explore all possible angles, combining it with studio discussions in front of a live audience, films and on the spot reports. Science Club won The Best TV General Programme Award at the 2013 European Science TV and New Media Awards beating off competition from QI, Science Squad and Biomimetics.

Episodes

References

External links

2012 British television series debuts
2013 British television series endings
BBC television documentaries about science
BBC television documentaries
English-language television shows